This is a list of years in Brazilian television.

Twenty-first century

Twentieth century

See also 
 List of years in Brazil
 Lists of Brazilian films
 List of years in television

Television
Television in Brazil by year
Brazilian television
years